Angela Ken Tavares Rojas (born May 16, 2002), better known as Angela Ken, is a Filipino singer-songwriter, dancer, occasional actress and influencer. She gained acclaim on social networking service TikTok. After releasing her single "Ako Naman Muna", she signed with Star Magic, a talent agency under ABS-CBN Corporation. Angela is also a member of the Squad Plus. In 2022, Angela made her acting debut in the iWantTFC musical series titled Lyric and Beat as Verlyn.

Career

2021
In 2021, Angela debuted with the release of her first single "Ako Naman Muna". An English version of the said song was released on July 23, 2021.

She also interpreted "Sila Pa Rin" for the soundtrack of Marry Me, Marry You.

In December 2021, Angela would be a part of the soundtrack for Saying Goodbye, where she interpreted the single "If We Fall in Love".

2022
Angela would later release her next single titled "It's Okay Not To Be Okay" on January 14, 2022. She later made her acting debut in the musical series Lyric and Beat, portraying Verlyn in the said series.

Around some time in August 2022, Angela was one of the artists who were part of the Beyond The Stars tour as part of Star Magic's 30th anniversary. The artists performed in a US Tour at the Kings Theatre in Brooklyn, New York, The Warfield in San Francisco, and in the Saban Theatre, Beverly Hills in Los Angeles. Prior to the tour, the artists (except SAB) first performed at the Newport Performing Arts Theater in Newport World Resorts.

Discography

Filmography

Television/Digital

References

2002 births
Living people
People from Imus
Star Magic
Star Music artists